The Belaya is a river in the Republic of Adygea and Krasnodar Krai of Russia. It is a left tributary of the Kuban, which it joins in the Krasnodar Reservoir. It has its sources at the main watershed of the Caucasus Mountains. In its upper reaches it is a typical mountain river, and flows through deep canyons, while in its lower parts it is a slow flowing lowland river.

Its main tributaries are, from source to mouth, Kisha (right), Dakh (right), Kurdzhips (left) and Pshekha (left). Several cities and towns are located along the river including Maykop and Belorechensk.

References

External links

Rivers of Krasnodar Krai
Rivers of Adygea